Toramus pulchellus is a species of pleasing fungus beetle in the family Erotylidae. Yellow-brown to dark colored, it is only 1.3mm to 1.6mm long. It is found in North America.

References

Further reading

External links

 
 

Erotylidae
Beetles described in 1863